Marriage Blue (lit. "The Night Before the Wedding") is a 2013 South Korean romantic comedy film that follows the misadventures of four engaged couples in the week leading up to their weddings.

Plot
Tae-kyu (Kim Kang-woo) is a former professional baseball player who currently coaches for a minor league team. His girlfriend Joo-young (Kim Hyo-jin) runs a successful urology clinic. They've broken up once before then gotten back together, and now they're about to get married. But a week before their wedding, Tae-kyu learns something about Joo-young that makes him feel betrayed and jealous. Growing increasingly neurotic, he becomes obsessed with finding all about her exes and dating past.

Chef Won-chul (Ok Taecyeon) and nail artist So-mi (Lee Yeon-hee) have been a couple for seven years and their wedding day is fast approaching. But feeling that something is missing in their life, So-mi suspects that Won-chul doesn't feel passionate towards her anymore and merely regards their relationship as a comfortable living arrangement. Several days before getting hitched, So-mi travels to Jeju Island for a nail art competition, and there she meets and becomes attracted to Kyung-soo (Ju Ji-hoon), a tour guide and webcomic writer.

Geon-ho (Ma Dong-seok) is a sweet, middle-aged bachelor who owns a flower shop, and he's about to marry Vika (Guzal Tursunova), who hails from Uzbekistan. When Geon-ho is suddenly afflicted with erectile dysfunction, he goes to see Joo-young, a urologist, who tells him that there's nothing wrong with him physically and his impotency may be caused by stress. Since Vika is beautiful and much younger than him, Geon-ho struggles with feelings of inadequacy and starts to wonder if she's only marrying him to attain Korean citizenship.

Dae-bok (Lee Hee-joon) works at Joo-young's urology clinic. He's recently began dating Yi-ra (Go Joon-hee), a wedding planner. Then one day, during a baseball game, Yi-ra tells him that she's pregnant, and Dae-bok immediately proposes. But as they prepare for their wedding, they keep arguing constantly. It isn't that Dae-bok is scared of becoming a father, but he senses from Yi-ra's cynical attitude that she doesn't feel their relationship has any kind of long-term future, so he desperately tries to change her mind.

Cast
Kim Kang-woo as Tae-kyu
Kim Hyo-jin as Joo-young
Ju Ji-hoon as Kyung-soo 
Lee Yeon-hee as So-mi
Ok Taecyeon as Won-chul
Ma Dong-seok as Geon-ho
Guzal Tursunova as Vika
Lee Hee-joon as Dae-bok
Go Joon-hee as Yi-ra
Oh Na-ra as Seon-ok
Joo as Ah-reum
Song Jae-ho as Kim Seok-dong 
Lee Joo-sil as Kim Seok-dong's wife 
Jang Gwang as Yi-ra's father
Jeon Soo-kyung as Dress shop owner, Yi-ra's boss
Kim Kwang-kyu as Doctor Kim, Joo-young's ex-husband
Hwang Jeong-min  as Woman touring Jeju
Lee Dal-hyeong as Installation engineer 
Lee Mi-do as Eccentric bride 
Kim Ji-young as Dae-bok's mother
 Nam Sang-ji as Society employee

Release
Despite little hype, it succeeded in securing a niche market amongst some heavier hitters, and on November 25, the fifth day of its release, the film ranked first in the daily box office chart, beating Friend: The Great Legacy and The Hunger Games: Catching Fire. On its second week, it placed second on the weekly box office chart, with 841,563 admissions. At the end of its run, it had a total of 1,214,351 admissions.

In addition to South Korea, rights to Marriage Blue were pre-sold to seven Asian countries, and local theaters in Singapore, Hong Kong, Japan, Thailand, Taiwan and China screened the film from December 2013 to May 2014.

References

External links
 

South Korean romantic comedy films
2013 films
Films about weddings
2010s South Korean films